Isbergues is a commune in the Pas-de-Calais department in the Hauts-de-France region of France.

Geography

On 1 January 1996, the former communes of Molinghem, Berguette and Isbergues were consolidated into a single commune and took the name of Isbergues.

History

The town was first known for the legend of St. Isbergues, the daughter of Pepin the Short and the sister of Charlemagne, who could supposedly cure diseases of the skin and eyes.
The town has experienced strong industrial development from the mid-19th century, thanks to the proximity of the Nord-Pas-de-Calais coal deposits.

The steel industry has benefitted from the use of the vast spaces besides the Canal d’Aire, which connects the town to the English Channel and the North Sea via the Deûle and the canals of northern Europe to the east. The area is also served by railway. The metal industry has marked the landscape and was a source of significant pollution, but it also made the fortunes of the town. The steelworks still employed 410 people in 2006. The Mittal company has pledged 2.5 million euros over three years as part of a revitalization plan. Several other industrial projects are planned for the commune in 2008.

Population

Places of interest

 The church of St. Isbergues, dating from the fifteenth century.
 The chapel of St. Isbergues, dating from the seventeenth century.
 A seventeenth century farmhouse at Molinghem.
 The church of St. Pierre, at Berguette, dating from the nineteenth century.
 The church of St. Maurice, at Molinghem, dating from the nineteenth century.
 The modern church of Saint-Eloi.
 The Commonwealth War Graves Commission cemetery.

The Grand Prix d'Isbergues is a cycling race first created in 1945 through the district of Pont-Balque. The town has organised events since 1947. This is the only exclusively professional cycling race in the department. It is ranked 1.1 by the Union Cycliste Internationale and is scheduled for the UCI Europe Tour.  
It is also registered as a qualifier for the Coupe de France. The Grand Prix d'Isbergues has experienced great champions such as Jacques Anquetil, Poulidor, Eddy Merckx, Bernard Hinault and Greg LeMond.

See also
Communes of the Pas-de-Calais department

References

External links

 The CWGC graves in the communal cemetery

Communes of Pas-de-Calais